Eragrostis tef, also known as teff, Williams lovegrass or annual bunch grass, is an annual grass, a species of lovegrass native to the Horn of Africa, notably to both Eritrea and Ethiopia. It is cultivated for its edible seeds, also known as teff.  Teff was one of the earliest plants domesticated.  It is one of the most important staple crops in Ethiopia and Eritrea.

Description
Eragrostis tef is a self pollinated tetraploid annual cereal grass. Teff is a  plant, which allows it to more efficiently fix carbon in drought and high temperatures, and is an intermediate between a tropical and temperate grass. The name teff is thought to originate from the Amharic word  teffa, which means "lost". This probably refers to its tiny seeds, which have a diameter smaller than 1 mm. Teff is a fine-stemmed, tufted grass with large crowns and many tillers. Its roots are shallow, but develop a massive fibrous rooting system. The plant height varies depending on the cultivation variety and the environmental conditions. As for many ancient crops, teff is quite adaptive and can grow in various environmental conditions; particularly, teff can be cultivated in dry environments, but also under wet conditions on marginal soils.

Teff originated in the Horn of Africa, corresponding to what is today modern day Ethiopia and Eritrea, where it is one of the most important cereals. It is grown for its edible seeds and also for its straw to feed the cattle. The seeds are very small, about a millimeter in length, and a thousand grains weigh approximately 0.3 grams. They can have a color from a white to a deep reddish brown. Teff is similar to millet and quinoa in cooking, but the seed is much smaller and cooks faster, thus using less fuel.

Distribution
Teff is mainly cultivated in Ethiopia and Eritrea, where it originates. It is one of the most important staple crops in these two countries, where it is used to make injera or Tayta. In 2016, Ethiopia grew more than 90 percent of the world's teff. It is now also marginally cultivated in India, Australia, Germany, the Netherlands, Spain, and the US, particularly in Idaho, California, Texas, and Nevada. Because of its very small seeds, a handful is enough to sow a large area. This property makes teff particularly suited to a seminomadic lifestyle.

History
Teff was one of the earliest plants domesticated. Teff is believed to have originated in Ethiopia between 4000 BC and 1000 BC. Genetic evidence points to E. pilosa as the most likely wild ancestor. A 19th-century identification of teff seeds from an ancient Egyptian site is now considered doubtful; the seeds in question (no longer available for study) are more likely of E. aegyptiaca, a common wild grass in Egypt.

Teff is the most important commodity produced and consumed in Eritrea and Ethiopia:  The flat pancake-like injera provide livelihood for around 6.5 million small farmers in the country.  In 2006, the Ethiopian government outlawed the export of raw teff, fearing export-driven domestic shortages like those suffered by South American countries after the explosion of quinoa consumption in Europe and the US.  Processed teff, namely injera, could still be exported and was mainly bought by the Ethiopian and Eritrean diaspora living in northern Europe, the Middle East and North America. After a few years, fears of a domestic shortage of teff in the scenario of an international market opening decreased. Teff yields had been increasing by 40 to 50% over the five previous years while prices had remained stable in Ethiopia. This led the government to partially lift the export ban in 2015. To ensure that the domestic production would not be minimized, the export licenses have only been granted to 48 commercial farmers which had not cultivated the plant before. Lack of mechanization is a barrier to potential increases in teff exports. Yet the increasing demand, rising by 7–10% per year, and the subsequent increase in exports is encouraging the country to speed up the modernization of agriculture and is also boosting research. Because of its potential as an economic success, a few other countries, including the US and some European countries, are already cultivating teff and selling it on domestic markets.

Uses

Teff is a multipurpose crop which has a high importance for the Ethiopian diet and culture. In Ethiopia, teff provides two-thirds of the daily protein intake. It is not only important for human nutrition, but also as fodder for livestock, or as building material. Teff is the main ingredient to prepare injera, a sourdough-risen flatbread. During meals, it is often eaten with meat or ground pulses. Sometimes it is also eaten as porridge. Moreover, teff can be used to prepare alcoholic drinks, called arak'e or katikalla or beer, called t'ella or fersso. Finally, due to its high mineral content, teff is also mixed with soybeans, chickpeas or other grains to manufacture baby foods.

According to a study in Ethiopia, farmers indicated a preference among consumers for white teff over darker colored varieties. As a nutritious fodder, teff is used to feed ruminants in Ethiopia and horses in the United States. It is a source of animal feed, especially during the dry season, and it is often preferred over straw from other cereals. Teff grass can be used as a construction material when mixed with mud to plaster the walls of local grain storage facilities.

Ecology
However, it does not tolerate frost. Yields decrease when annual rainfall falls below 250 mm and when the average temperature during pollination exceeds 22 °C. Despite its superficial root system, teff is quite drought-resistant thanks to its ability to regenerate rapidly after a moderate water stress and to produce fruits in a short time span. It is daylight-sensitive and flowers best with 12 hours of daylight. Teff is usually cultivated on pH neutral soils, but it was noticed that it could sustain acidity up to a pH below 5. Teff has a C4 photosynthesis mechanism.

Cultivation

The cultivation of teff is labor-intensive and the small size of its seeds makes it difficult to handle and transport without loss. In Ethiopia, teff is mostly produced during the main rain season, between July and November. It is known as an "emergency crop" because it is planted late in the season, when the temperatures are warmer, and most other crops have already been planted. Teff germination generally occurs 3–12 days after sowing. Optimal germination temperatures range from 15 to 35 °C; below 10 °C, germination almost does not occur. Teff is traditionally sown or broadcast by hand, on firm, humid soil. Usual sowing density ranges from 15 to 20 kg/ha, though farmers can sow up to 50 kg/ha, because the seeds are hard to spread equally and a higher sowing density helps to reduce weed competition at the early stage. Seeds are either left at the soil surface or slightly covered by a thin layer of soil, but must not be planted at a depth greater than 1 cm. The field can be subsequently rolled. Sowing can also be done mechanically; row planting reduces lodging.

Recommended fertilization doses are 25–60 kg/ha for N, and 10–18 kg/ha for P. Teff responds more to nitrogen than to phosphorus; thus, high nitrogen inputs increase the biomass production and size of the plants, thereby increasing lodging. To avoid this, farmers can decrease nitrogen input, cultivate teff after a legume crop or adjust sowing time so that the rains have stopped when the crop reaches heading stage. In Ethiopia, teff is commonly used in crop rotations with other cereals and legumes.

Teff is harvested 2–6 months after sowing, when the vegetative parts start to turn yellow. If teff is harvested past its maturation, seeds will fall off, especially in windy or rainy weather conditions. In Ethiopia, harvest lasts from November to January; harvest is usually done manually, with sickles. Farmers cut the plants at the soil surface, pile them up in the field and transport them to the threshing area. Teff is traditionally threshed by using animals walking on the harvest. Alternatively, some farmers rent threshing machines used for other cereals. The seeds are easy to store, as they are resistant to most pests during storage. Teff seeds can stay viable several years if direct contact with humidity and sun is avoided. Average yields in Ethiopia reach around two tonnes per ha. One single inflorescence can produce up to 1000 seeds, and one plant up to 10,000. Moreover, teff offers some promising opportunities for breeding programs: the first draft of the Eragrostis tef genome was published in 2014 and research institutes have started selecting for more resistant varieties. In 1996, the US National Research Council characterized teff as having the "potential to improve nutrition, boost food security, foster rural development and support sustainable landcare."

Challenges and prospects
The major challenges in teff production are its low yield and high susceptibility to lodging. Efforts to conventionally breed teff towards higher yields started in the 1950s and led to an average annual increase in yield of 0.8%. However, no considerable improvements concerning the susceptibility of lodging have been made, due mainly to low demand outside of Ethiopia and Eritrea.

High-yielding varieties, such as Quencho, were widely adopted by farmers in Ethiopia. Sequencing of the teff genome improved breeding, and an ethyl methanesulphonate (EMS)-mutagenized population was then used to breed the first semi-dwarf lodging-tolerant teff line, called kegne. In 2015, researchers tested 28 new teff varieties and identified three promising lines that generated yields of up to 4.7 tonnes per ha.

The "Teff Improvement Project" marked a milestone by releasing the first teff variety Tesfa to the Ethiopian markets in March 2017. Areas of further development include: "(i) improving productivity of teff; (ii) overcoming the lodging malady; (iii) developing climate-smart and appropriate crop and soil management options; (iv) developing tolerance to abiotic stresses such as drought and soil acidity; (v) developing suitable pre- and post-harvest mechanization technologies suitable for smallholder farmers as well as commercial farms; (vi) food processing and nutrition aspects with special attention to the development of different food recipes and value-added products; (vii) developing crop protection measures against diseases, insect pests and weeds; and (viii) improving or strengthening socio-economics and agricultural extension services."

Pests
The tef shoot fly (Atherigona hyalinipennis) is a major pest of the crop.

Other insect pests include:

central shoot fly Delia arambourgi (seedling feeder)
Wello-bush cricket Decticoides brevipennis (flower feeder)
red tef worm Mentaxya ignicollis
tef epilachna beetle Chnootriba similis (leaf feeder); also transmits rice yellow mottle virus in rice
chrysomelid black beetle Erlangerius niger (adults feed on developing grains and leaves)
stem-boring wasp Eurytomocharis eragrostidis in the United States

Nutritional value

Uncooked teff is 9% water, 73% carbohydrates, 13% protein, and 2% fat. Cooked teff is 75% water, 20% carbohydrates, 4% protein, and less than 1% fat (table). A  reference serving of cooked teff provides  of food energy, is a rich source of protein, dietary fiber, and manganese, and contains moderate amounts of thiamin, phosphorus, iron, magnesium, and zinc (table). The fiber content in teff is also higher than in most other cereals.

While teff is gluten free, a method has been developed to process teff into a flour with a wider range of baking applications, such as for bread and pasta.

Patent and bio-piracy

In 2003, a Dutch company, Health and Performance Food International (HPFI), paired with the Ethiopian Institute of Biodiversity Conservation to introduce teff to European markets. The original agreement was for Ethiopia to provide HPFI with a dozen strains of teff to market globally, and the two entities would split the proceeds.

HPFI's CEO, Jan Roosjen, had taken out two patents on teff in 2003 and 2007, claiming that his way of milling and storing the flour was unique. HPFI went bankrupt in 2009, allowing Roosjen to continue to utilize those patents and the marketing rights for the grain while being freed from the original agreement with Ethiopia. Ethiopia only received 4,000 euros over five years of collaboration.

Roosjen ended up suing a Dutch bakery company, Bakers, for patent infringement because they were selling teff baked goods. The Dutch patent office declared that the patent was void, citing that the methods used to bake and mix flours were 'general professional knowledge. The deadline for Roosjen to appeal the decision expired in 2019, officially allowing Ethiopia access to Dutch teff markets.

However, Roosjen's company Ancientgrains BV still maintains patent rights in Belgium, Germany, Britain, Austria and Italy.

Teff is inherent to Ethiopia's national culture and identity, and the government of Ethiopia has expressed intent to hold Roosjen accountable to the fullest extent of international patent law, as well as to regain ownership over international markets of its most important food.

See also
weeping lovegrass
Injera

References

External links
Traditional Crops: Teff Food and Agriculture Organization of the United Nations (FAO)
Teff: Overview Encyclopedia of Food Grains, 2nd ed., Academic Press, 2016
Eragrostis tef (Zucc.) Trotter Purdue University Center for New Crops & Plant Products
 Tef (Eragrostis tef) hay Feedipedia, a programme by INRA, CIRAD, AFZ and FAO, 2017
 Tef Improvement Project University of Bern

tef
Crops
Flora of Northeast Tropical Africa
Flora of East Tropical Africa
Flora of the Arabian Peninsula
Cereals
Ethiopian cuisine
Crops originating from Ethiopia